San Pedro de Tiquina is a town in the La Paz Department, Bolivia. 

It is also home to Bolivian Navy flotilla and 4th Naval Service Area/Naval Military Police Battalion #1.

References 

  Instituto Nacional de Estadistica de Bolivia  (INE)

See also 
 Strait of Tiquina

Populated places in La Paz Department (Bolivia)

it:San Pedro de Tiquina